Cecchetti is an Italian surname. Notable people with the surname include:

  Alberto Cecchetti (born 1944), politician of San Marino
 Enrico Cecchetti (1850–1928), Italian ballet dancer and theorist, creator of the Cecchetti method
  Silvia Cecchetti (born 1970), Italian singer

References

Italian-language surnames
Surnames of Czech origin